In number theory, an Euler product is an expansion of a Dirichlet series into an infinite product indexed by prime numbers. The original such product was given for the sum of all positive integers raised to a certain power as proven by Leonhard Euler. This series and its continuation to the entire complex plane would later become known as the Riemann zeta function.

Definition
In general, if  is a bounded multiplicative function, then the Dirichlet series

is equal to

In fact, if we consider these as formal generating functions, the existence of such a formal Euler product expansion is a necessary and sufficient condition that  be multiplicative: this says exactly that  is the product of the  whenever  factors as the product of the powers  of distinct primes .

Then

as is the case for the Riemann zeta function, where , and more generally for Dirichlet characters.

Convergence
In practice all the important cases are such that the infinite series and infinite product expansions are absolutely convergent in some region

that is, in some right half-plane in the complex numbers. This already gives some information, since the infinite product, to converge, must give a non-zero value; hence the function given by the infinite series is not zero in such a half-plane.

In the theory of modular forms it is typical to have Euler products with quadratic polynomials in the denominator here.

Examples
The following examples will use the notation  for the set of all primes, that is:

The Euler product attached to the Riemann zeta function , also using the sum of the geometric series, is

while for the Liouville function , it is

Using their reciprocals, two Euler products for the Möbius function  are

and

Taking the ratio of these two gives

and so on, with the first result known by Ramanujan. This family of infinite products is also equivalent to

Here it is convenient to omit the primes  dividing the conductor  from the product. In his notebooks, Ramanujan generalized the Euler product for the zeta function as

for  where  is the polylogarithm. For  the product above is just .

Notable constants
Many well known constants have Euler product expansions.

The Leibniz formula for 

can be interpreted as a Dirichlet series using the (unique) Dirichlet character modulo 4, and converted to an Euler product of superparticular ratios (fractions where numerator and denominator differ by 1):

where each numerator is a prime number and each denominator is the nearest multiple of 4.

Other Euler products for known constants include:

The Hardy–Littlewood twin prime constant:

The Landau–Ramanujan constant:

 Murata's constant :

 The strongly carefree constant  :

Artin's constant :

Landau's totient constant :

The carefree constant  :

and its reciprocal :

The Feller–Tornier constant :

The quadratic class number constant :

The totient summatory constant :

Sarnak's constant :

The carefree constant :

The strongly carefree constant :

Stephens' constant :

Barban's constant :

Taniguchi's constant :

The Heath-Brown and Moroz constant :

Notes

References

 G. Polya, Induction and Analogy in Mathematics Volume 1 Princeton University Press (1954) L.C. Card 53-6388 (A very accessible English translation of Euler's memoir regarding this "Most Extraordinary Law of the Numbers" appears starting on page 91)
  (Provides an introductory discussion of the Euler product in the context of classical number theory.)
 G.H. Hardy and E.M. Wright, An introduction to the theory of numbers, 5th ed., Oxford (1979)  (Chapter 17 gives further examples.)
 George E. Andrews, Bruce C. Berndt, Ramanujan's Lost Notebook: Part I, Springer (2005), 
 G. Niklasch, ''Some number theoretical constants: 1000-digit values"

External links

 

 
 

Analytic number theory
Zeta and L-functions
Mathematical constants
Infinite products